The 2007 Asian Youth Boys Volleyball Championship was held in Stadium Badminton, Kuala Lumpur, Malaysia from 19 to 27 May 2007.

Pools composition
The teams are seeded based on their final ranking at the 2005 Asian Youth Boys Volleyball Championship.

Preliminary round

Pool A

|}

|}

Pool B

|}

|}

Classification 9th–11th

Semifinals

|}

11th place

|}

Final round

Quarterfinals

|}

5th–8th semifinals

|}

Semifinals

|}

7th place

|}

5th place

|}

3rd place

|}

Final

|}

Final standing

Team Roster
Mojtaba Shaban, Moein Rahimi, Hamed Bagherpour, Ashkan Derakhshan, Farhad Salafzoun, Edris Daneshfar, Farhad Ghaemi, Ebrahim Chabokian, Arash Kamalvand, Amin Razavi, Golmohammad Sakhavi, Alireza Jadidi
Head Coach: Jovica Cvetković

Awards
MVP:  Mojtaba Shaban
Best Scorer:  Mojtaba Shaban
Best Spiker:  Chen Ping
Best Blocker:  Aidan Zingel
Best Server:  Chen Ping
Best Setter:  Cheng Li-sheng
Best Digger:  Shogo Hayase
Best Receiver:  Chien Wei-lun

References
 www.asianvolleyball.org

External links
FIVB

A
V
V
Asian Boys' U18 Volleyball Championship